is a Japanese tokusatsu science fiction television series created by Eiji Tsuburaya. It is the third installment in the Ultra Series and was produced by Tsuburaya Productions. The series aired on Tokyo Broadcasting System from October 1, 1967 to September 8, 1968.

Premise
In the not-too-distant future, Earth finds itself constantly under attack from extraterrestrial threats. To combat them, the Terrestrial Defense Force establishes the Ultra Garrison, a team of six elite members who utilize high-tech vehicles and weaponry. Joining their fight is the mysterious Dan Moroboshi who is secretly an alien from the Land of Light in Nebula M-78 and transforms into his true alien form, Ultraseven, in times of crisis.

Production
After the success of space-themed science fiction shows such as Ultraman, Captain Ultra, and the Japanese broadcast of Lost in Space, Tokyo Broadcasting System pursued Tsuburaya Productions to produce another sci-fi series. This led Eiji Tsuburaya to assemble Hajime Tsuburaya, Akio Jissoji, Tetsuo Kinjo, Masami Sueyasu, and Shoji Otomo to brainstorm ideas.

Eiji Tsuburaya proposed a series that would have been a hybrid of Thunderbirds and Lost in Space, Hajime proposed a new Ultraman series that would have included network and sponsors' input for each season, Jissoji proposed a time-travel themed show which would have focused on a time patrol team and their families, Kinjo proposed a children's horror/mystery show that would have been a hybrid of Ultra Q and The Twilight Zone, Sueyasu proposed a fairy tale-themed series, and Otomo proposed a space-themed series which would have been a cross of Lost in Space and Men into Space featuring giant monsters.

TBS eventually settled on a fusion of Eiji's and Otomo's ideas and Eiji submitted a treatment titled The Ultra Garrison, which featured six trained astronauts (including an android named "John") stationed on a satellite called "Mother", the first line of defense against alien invaders. Kinjo felt that the idea was lacking an essential element and suggested adding a superhero.

The treatment underwent massive revisions after TBS felt the idea was too similar to The Great Space War and the new version included giant monsters while retaining the original Earth Defense Force element at TBS' request. TBS eventually suggested to make the series a direct sequel to Ultraman and have it focused on Hayata and Fuji's son, who would be able to call upon Earth monsters for help and only transform into Ultraman in times of desperation.

Tetsuo Kinjo began working on an outline, combining elements of TBS' best ideas and his own, such as elements from his rejected proposal Woo, which featured an alien unwittingly becoming a savior of mankind. Kinjo's outline was titled Ultra Eye and featured Dan Moroboshi being the son of a human and an alien, with Dan coming to Earth in search of his mother. This version also featured Capsule Monsters that Dan would have used when he could not transform. Originally, monsters from Ultra Q and Ultraman were going to be used as the Capsule Monsters in order to cut down production costs.

Tohru Narita was assigned to design the aliens, monsters, and vehicles. Narita's design for Ultraseven was inspired by Mayan culture and originally chose silver and blue for the colors, but changed them to silver and red to avoid problems with the blue-screen matte process. Principal photography on the special effects began in May 1967 and casting began in June 1967. Many of the actors hired were chosen from Toho's acting pool, since the studio was one of the financial investors for Tsuburaya Productions. Yoji Hashimoto and Toshimichi Miwa were put in charge of duties with TBS for the show, while Eiji Tsuburaya served as the chief producer and supervisor for the show and Masami Sueyasu reprised his role as a hands-on producer for Tsuburaya Productions.

Four episodes were completed before copyright was approved for the show's title, which was changed to Ultraseven. The show was filmed silent, a common practice for Japanese shows at the time, and post-production, including editing and voice dubbing, began in September 1967. Toru Fuyuki was hired to compose the soundtrack, gearing towards a more classical direction as opposed to the jazz-inspired direction Kunio Miyauchi took for the Ultraman soundtrack.

Ultraseven aired on October 1, 1967 and earned a 33.7% rating, an achievement at the time. Due to the show's high ratings, TBS ordered an additional 10 episodes during preparations for the show's third Cours (episodes 27-39). Despite ratings dropping during the final weeks, Ultraseven still remained in the top five highest rated shows in Japanese television at the time.

Sequels for both Ultraman, titled Ultraman Continues, and Ultraseven, titled Fight! Ultraseven, were proposed, but Tsuburaya Productions would not produce another Ultra series until 1971, with Return of Ultraman.

Cast

Kohji Moritsugu as Dan Moroboshi/Ultraseven: Spelled as "Dan Moroboshe" in the Cinar English dub. Ultraseven borrows the look of Jiroh Satsuma and transforms into his true alien form using the Ultra Eye ("Task Mask" in the Cinar dub). At the time of the show's production, Moritsugu was married and poor. This was kept secret in order to publicize Moritsugu as a rising young heartthrob.
Shōji Nakayama as Captain Kaoru Kiriyama: The captain of the Ultra Garrison.
Sandayū Dokumamushi as Shigeru Furuhashi: The rotund, strong and trigger-happy member of the Ultra Garrison.
Yuriko Hishimi as Anne Yuri: Known as "Donna" in the Cinar dub. The team's communications operator and nurse. Yoshiko Toyoura was originally cast in the role, but was pulled out by director Takashi Tsuboshima to cast her in his then-latest film. Hishimi was given the role after doing an immediate audition and photo shoot.
Shinsuke Achiha as Soga: The Ultra Garrison's expert marksman.
Bin Furuya as Amagi: The team's strategist. Furuya had been the suit performer for Ultraman in the preceding series and stated that, although he liked being Ultraman, Amagi was more enjoyable due to having an exposed appearance.
Koji Uenishi as Ultraseven (suit performer): Uenishi portrayed Ultraseven for the entire series while Eiichi Kikuchi did the suit performance for episodes 14 and 15.

Episodes

Banned episode
The 12th episode, titled "From Another Planet with Love", was banned due to Alien Spell (which had keloid scars) being labeled as "Hibaku Seijin" (A-Bomb Survivor Alien) which was lifted from the term "hibakusha", referring to the survivors of the atomic bombings of Hiroshima and Nagasaki. The issue was featured on an article of the Asahi Shimbun newspaper, which sparked public outrage and forced Tsuburaya Productions to change the name to "Kyuketsu Seijin" (Vampire Alien). Despite this, Tsuburaya Productions still received negative public opinion and as a result, Tsuburaya pulled the alien character and episode from official publications, broadcasts and home media releases. However, the Hawaiian English dub and Cinar dub of the series broadcast the episode (which was re-titled "Crystallized Corpuscles") in North America.

English versions

In 1985, Turner Program Services licensed the series in a 15-year contract from Tsuburaya Productions, who provided the English dubbed versions produced in Honolulu by Tsuburaya-Hawaii, Inc. in the mid-1970s. Finding this English version to be lacking, Turner commissioned the Canadian children's programming production house, Cinar, to dub all 49 episodes for run in syndication. The TPS/Cinar produced episodes featured new opening and closing credits, eyecatches, new episode names, and even a change of name for the character of Anne Yuri, who was dubbed as "Donna Michibata". Cinar edited the episodes for violence, language and commercial time and featured new music cues.

Unsatisfied with Cinar's resultant work, Turner put the series into their vaults until 1994, when they were alerted that the episodes were never broadcast. Ultraseven was dusted off for the "Toons 'Til Noon" and "MonsterVision" blocks on TNT. The "Toons 'Til Noon" broadcasts received substantially heavy editing to make them suitable for the time slot, while the "MonsterVision" broadcasts were the full-length Cinar adaptations. Episodes 3 and 5-7 were missing or mislabeled and were never broadcast. Clips from the series were later used in the "Messages from Space" segments on the animated variety show Cartoon Planet, which aired on TBS and Cartoon Network. When the contract expired in 2001, Turner returned all the materials (film elements, videotapes, audio masters) to Tsuburaya Productions.

Home media

Japan
Bandai Visual released the series on Blu-ray in Japan as two separate sets with the first released on November 21, 2014 and the second on January 28, 2015. In September 2020, NHK aired 4K restorations of the series, converted from 16 mm film with HDR.

North America
In December 2012, Shout! Factory released the Japanese version on DVD, licensed from UM Corporation through Tiga Entertainment. In July 2019, Mill Creek Entertainment announced that it had acquired most of the Ultraman library from Tsuburaya Productions through Indigo Entertainment, including 1,100 episodes and 20 films. Mill Creek released the series on Blu-ray and digital on December 10, 2019 in standard and steelbook editions.

In July 2020, Shout! Factory announced to have struck a multi-year deal with Alliance Entertainment and Mill Creek Entertainment, with the blessings of Tsuburaya and Indigo, that granted them the exclusive SVOD and AVOD digital rights to the Ultra series and films (1,100 episodes and 20 films) acquired by Mill Creek the previous year. Ultraseven, amongst other titles, will stream in the United States and Canada through Shout! Factory TV and Tokushoutsu.

Legacy
Pokémon creator Satoshi Tajiri said that the Poké Ball concept was inspired by Ultraseven's Capsule Monsters.

See also
 Prefectural Earth Defense Force

References

Sources

External links

Official website of Tsuburaya Productions 
Ultraman Connection — Official website 
Official Ultraman channel at YouTube

 
1967 Japanese television series debuts
1968 Japanese television series endings
Alien invasions in television
Japanese action television series
Japanese science fiction television series
Jiro Kuwata
Teleportation in fiction
Television series about shapeshifting
TBS Television (Japan) original programming
Ultra television series